Paul John Fenton Jr. (born December 22, 1959) is an American former ice hockey forward and executive. He has previously served as the general manager for the Minnesota Wild. Before joining the Wild, he had worked as assistant general manager with the Nashville Predators.

Playing career

Fenton played amateur hockey with Vermont Academy, but started his National Hockey League career with the Hartford Whalers in 1985. He also played for the New York Rangers, Los Angeles Kings, Winnipeg Jets, Toronto Maple Leafs, Calgary Flames, and San Jose Sharks.  He retired from the NHL after the 1992 season.

In 1983, while playing for the Peoria Prancers, Fenton won the Ken McKenzie Trophy, awarded to the most outstanding American-born rookie playing in the International Hockey League.

Executive career
Before being named general manager and chief of the Minnesota Wild on May 21, 2018, Fenton was an assistant general manager with the NHL's Nashville Predators, while simultaneously serving as the general manager of the AHL's Milwaukee Admirals.

After just one season, Fenton was relieved of his duties as General Manager of the Minnesota Wild on July 30, 2019.

Personal life
Fenton is the son of Paul Fenton Sr. and Joann Mullin, his father was the Police Chief of the city of Springfield, Massachusetts for 14 years and worked for the police for over 40 years. Fenton has two sons, one of whom, P. J. Fenton, played hockey for the AHL's Rochester Americans and is currently a part of the Minnesota Wild's amateur scouting team. His other son Owen is an assistant professor in the Department of Chemical and Biomolecular Engineering at National University of Singapore (NUS).

Career statistics

Regular season and playoffs

International

See also
 American ice hockey players

References

External links
 

1959 births
Living people
Vermont Academy alumni
American men's ice hockey forwards
Anaheim Ducks scouts
Binghamton Whalers players
Boston University Terriers men's ice hockey players
Calgary Flames players
Colorado Flames players
Columbus Blue Jackets scouts
Florida Panthers
Hartford Whalers players
Ice hockey people from Massachusetts
Los Angeles Kings players
Minnesota Wild general managers
Nashville Predators executives
National Hockey League general managers
New Haven Nighthawks players
New York Rangers players
Peoria Prancers players
San Jose Sharks players
Sportspeople from Springfield, Massachusetts
Toronto Maple Leafs players
Undrafted National Hockey League players
Winnipeg Jets (1979–1996) players
Ice hockey players from Massachusetts